Hidden Beach is an American independent record label known for R&B, soul, inspirational and contemporary jazz genres. Hidden Beach was formed in 1998 by Steve McKeever and holds a distribution deal with Universal Music Group.

History

Steven McKeever, a former entertainment lawyer and Motown producer, founded Hidden Beach Recordings (HBR) in 1998. With a staff of two, McKeever solicited Charles Whitfield to join him to handle production and artist relations. A graduate of North Carolina Central University, Whitfield had been hired as a paid intern with no record label experience. Whitfield introduced McKeever to professional basketball star Michael Jordan, who became one of the lead investors in Hidden Beach.

Previously, Hidden Beach had four label imprints, focusing on different genres of music. Still Waters, a Hidden Beach Experience is the label imprint dedicated to inspirational music releases which includes gospel music, motivational music and inspirational speeches. The debut release on Still Waters was nominated for a Grammy, Dove and Stellar Awards. Hidden Beach Celebration Series focuses on specialty themed albums such as Christmas and Mother's Day releases. HBR's first Celebration Series released was Bebe Winans' My Christmas Prayer which topped five different Billboard charts, was named as one of Oprah Winfrey's Favorite Things and became Starbucks' biggest selling holiday album of 2004.

Hidden Beach was tapped as the label to release the Yes We Can: Voices of a Grassroots Movement compilation CD, with proceeds to benefit the Barack Obama campaign. Artists on the project included Kanye West, Stevie Wonder and Sheryl Crow. It was released on September 18, 2008.

Following the election of President Obama, Hidden Beach produced the official inauguration collection commemorative CD-DVD set. Change Is Now: Renewing America's Promise includes 17 tracks by various artists and eight of President Obama's speeches. Artists include Stevie Wonder, Sheryl Crow, James Taylor, will.i.am, Robin Thicke, Maroon 5, India.arie and more.

In 2014, Hidden Beach Recordings changed its umbrella imprint to Hidden Beach Experiences, still keeping Hidden Beach Recordings for the signed artists.

Hidden Beach's first artist to sign to the label was Jill Scott, who, to date, is their bestselling artist. The inaugural release, Who Is Jill Scott? Words and Sounds Vol. 1, has sold 2.4 million units according to Nielsen,  and was nominated for four Grammy Awards. Other artists include a capella group Naturally 7, Kindred, saxophonist Mike Phillips, and Angie Fisher.

One of its newest divisions is Guardians of Soul, created to house estate deals. The company works with estates of noted celebrities, starting in 2015 with The Power of Love: Luther Vandross Experience, a tribute to the musician in conjunction with his estate.

Compilations
Cornel West & BMWMB
Hidden Hits
Yes We Can:  Voices of a Grassroots Movement (for the 2008 Obama Presidential Campaign)
Change Is Now: Renewing America's Promise (for the 2012 President Obama campaign)

Unwrapped music series
An ongoing series of albums, Unwrapped, has at least eight volumes. The series features instrumental versions of rap/hip-hop hits by contemporary jazz artists.

Unwrapped, Vol. 1 
Unwrapped, Vol. 2 
Unwrapped, Vol. 3; features 50 Cent's "In Da Club" and Eminem's "Lose Yourself" as interpreted by keyboardists Jeff Lorber and former Earth, Wind & Fire member Larry Dunn, Hidden Beach saxophonist Mike Phillips and others. It debuted at No. 3 on the Billboard Contemporary Jazz chart and No. 4 on the jazz chart. 
Unwrapped: Vol 4 (released June 24, 2006) peaked at number 3 on the Top Contemporary Jazz charts
Unwrapped Vol. 5: the Collipark Cafe Sessions (released June 24, 2008); includes Southern hip-hop hits

Box sets of volumes 1 through 4 and volumes 5 through 7 have been produced.

List of artists
listed alphabetically

Bent Fabric (licensed only)
Peter Black
Jeff Bradshaw
John Densmore - Tribaljazz
Sunny Hawkins
Kindred the Family Soul
Ramsey Lewis (licensed only)
Lina
Onitsha
Mike Phillips
Darius Rucker
Brenda Russell
Jill Scott
Al B. Sure!
The Tony Rich Project
Dr. Cornel West & BMWMB
BeBe Winans
Keite Young
Gene Noble

Discography
Jill Scott - Who Is Jill Scott:  Words and Sounds - Vol. 1 (2000)
Brenda Russell:  Paris Rain (2000)
Hidden Beach Recordings Presents:  Unwrapped Vol. 1 (2001)
Jill Scott:  Experience Jill Scott 826+ (2001)
Darius Rucker:  Back to Then (2002)
Hidden Beach Recordings Presents:  Unwrapped Vol. 2 (2002)
Kindred the Family Soul:  Surrender to Love (2003)
BeBe Winans:  My Christmas Prayer (2003)
Hidden Beach Recordings Presents:  Unwrapped Vol. 3 (December 2004)
Jill Scott: Beautifully Human, Words and Sounds - Vol. 2 (2004)
BeBe Winans:  Dream (2005)
Lina:  The Inner Beauty Movement (2005)
Mike Phillips:  Uncommon Denominator (2005)
Hidden Beach Recordings Presents: Unwrapped Vol. 4 (2005)
Bent Fabric:  Jukebox (2006)
Tribaljazz (feat. John Densmore) (2006)
Hidden Beach Recordings Presents:  You Have Reached Mike Phillips (2006)
Kindred the Family Soul:  In This Life Together (2006)
Jill Scott:  Collaborations (2007)
Onitsha:  Church Girl (2007)
Sunny Hawkins:  More Of You (2007)
Cornel West & BMWMB (2007)
Keite Young: The Rise and Fall of Keite Young (2007)
Jill Scott:  The Real Thing, Words and Sounds Vol. 3 (2007)
Jill Scott:  Live in Paris+ (2008)
Hidden Beach Recordings Presents:  Unwrapped Vol. 5.0 (2008)
Hidden Beach Recordings Presents:  Unwrapped - The Ultimate Box Set - Vols. 1-4 (2009)
Hidden Beach Presents:  Hidden Hits  Vol. 1 (2009)
Jeff Bradshaw:  Bone Appetit Vol. 1 (2012)
The Tony Rich Project:  Exist (2008)
Kindred the Family Soul:  the Arrival (2008)
Change Is Now:  Renewing America's Promise (Obama 2012 campaign) (2009)
Al B Sure:  Honey I'm Home (2009)
Hidden Beach Recordings Presents:  Unwrapped Vol. 6 "Give the Drummer Some" featuring Tony Royster (2009)
Hidden Beach Recordings Presents:  Unwrapped Vol. 7 "Back to Basics" (2010)
Mike Phillips:  M.P.3 (2010)
Hidden Beach Valentines Vol. 1:  Love, Passion & Other Emotions (2011)
Naturally 7:  Christmas, A Love Story (2011)
Naturally 7:  VocalPlay (2010) 
Jill Scott:  The Original Jill Scott from the Vault, Vol. 1 (2011)
Ramsey Lewis and His Electric Band:  Taking Another Look (2011)
Jeff Bradshaw:  Bone Appetit (2012)
Jill Scott:  Crates Remix Fundamentals Vol. 1 (2012)
Peter Black:  Neverwhere, Peter Black's Book Vol. 1 (2012)
Naturally 7:  Hidden In Plain Sight (2014)
Angie Fisher (single):  "I.R.S." (2014)
Jill Scott:  Golden Moments (greatest hits) (2015)
Kindred the Family Soul:  Family Treasures (2015)
Angie Fisher (single):  "Hide & Seek" (2015)
Angie Fisher (single):  "Summertime" (2015)
Jill Scott (Collection):  "By Popular Demand" (2018)
Hidden Beach Recordings Presents:  Unwrapped Vol. 8 "The Chicago Sessions" (2019)

References

External links
Hidden Beach official website

American record labels
Soul music record labels
Contemporary R&B record labels
Hip hop record labels